Groton is a census-designated place (CDP) in the town of Groton in Middlesex County, Massachusetts, United States. The population was 1,124 at the 2010 census.

Geography
Groton is located at  (42.608216, -71.572526).

According to the United States Census Bureau, the CDP has a total area of 4.4 km2 (1.7 mi2), all land.

Demographics

As of the census of 2000, there were 1,113 people, 442 households, and 260 families residing in the CDP. The population density was 254.3/km2 (659.3/mi2). There were 459 housing units at an average density of 104.9/km2 (271.9/mi2). The racial makeup of the CDP was 94.61% White, 0.72% Black or African American, 0.27% Native American, 1.08% Asian, 0.18% Pacific Islander, 0.99% from other races, and 2.16% from two or more races. Hispanic or Latino of any race were 1.44% of the population.

There were 442 households, out of which 33.0% had children under the age of 18 living with them, 46.8% were married couples living together, 9.5% had a female householder with no husband present, and 41.0% were non-families. 34.4% of all households were made up of individuals, and 15.4% had someone living alone who was 65 years of age or older. The average household size was 2.35 and the average family size was 3.14.

In the CDP, the population was spread out, with 27.7% under the age of 18, 6.7% from 18 to 24, 31.3% from 25 to 44, 21.1% from 45 to 64, and 13.2% who were 65 years of age or older. The median age was 35 years. For every 100 females, there were 86.7 males. For every 100 females age 18 and over, there were 76.5 males.

The median income for a household in the CDP was $58,409, and the median income for a family was $80,981. Males had a median income of $60,833 versus $32,292 for females. The per capita income for the CDP was $33,044. About 6.6% of families and 11.4% of the population were below the poverty line, including 15.3% of those under age 18 and none of those age 65 or over.

References

Census-designated places in Middlesex County, Massachusetts
Census-designated places in Massachusetts